This is a list of community council areas established in each of the council areas of Scotland.

As of 2012–3, there are 1,369 community council areas in Scotland, of which 1,129 (82%) have active community councils. There are also 3 Neighbourhood Representative Structures established in Dundee as alternatives to community councils.

Scottish community councils date from 1976, when they were established by district council and islands council schemes created under the Local Government (Scotland) Act 1973. The same act had established a two-tier system of local government in Scotland consisting of regional and district councils, except for the islands councils, which were created as unitary local authorities.  The Local Government etc (Scotland) Act 1994 abolished regional and district councils and transferred responsibility for community council schemes to new unitary councils created by the same act.

Aberdeen City 
As of October 2021, there are 30 community council areas in the council area.
Ashley and Broomhill
Braeside and Mannofield
Bridge of Don
Bucksburn and Newhills
Castlehill and Pittodrie
City Centre 
Cove and Altens
Craigiebuckler and Seafield
Culter
Cults, Bieldside and Milltimber
Danestone
Dyce and Stoneywood
Ferryhill and Ruthrieston – not established
Froghall, Powis and Sunnybank
Garthdee
George Street
Kincorth and Leggart 
Kingswells
Mastrick, Sheddocksley and Summerhill
Nigg
Northfield 
Old Aberdeen
Queens Cross and Harlaw
Rosehill and Stockethill – not established
Rosemount and Mile End
Seaton and Linksfield – not established
Tillydrone
Torry – not established
Woodend – not established
Woodside and Hilton

Aberdeenshire
As of July 2012, there are 73 community council areas in the council area. Those marked with asterisks have active community councils. Each of the areas under the council's decentralisation scheme is divided into community council areas as follows:

Banff and Buchan
Aberchirder and Marnoch	
Aberdour and Tyrie	
Alvah and Forglen	
Banff and Macduff*
Cornhill-Ordiquhill	
Fordyce, Sandend and District*
Fraserburgh*
Invercairn	
King Edward-Gamrie*
Portsoy and District	
Rathen*
Rosehearty*
Sandhaven and Pitullie	
Whitehills and District*

Buchan
Boddam and District*
Buchan East*
Cruden*
Deer*
Longside and District*
Mintlaw and District*
New Pitsligo*
Peterhead*
Strichen and District*

Formartine
Auchterless and Inverkeithny*
Belhelvie*
Ellon*
Foveran*
Fyvie/Rothienorman/Monquhitter*
Meldrum and Bourtie*
Methlick*
Slains and Collieston*
Tarves*
Turriff*
Udny*
Ythan*

Garioch
Bennachie
Cluny, Midmar and Monymusk
Echt and Skene
Fintray and Kinellar*
Inverurie*
Kemnay*
Kintore and District*
Newmachar*
Westhill and Elrick*

Kincardine and Mearns
Arbuthnott*
Benholm and Johnshaven*
Catterline, Kinneff and Dunnottar*
Crathes, Drumoak and Durris*
Gourdon*
Mearns*
Newtonhill, Muchalls and Cammachmore*
North Kincardine Rural*
Portlethen and District
Royal Burgh of Inverbervie*
St Cyrus*
Stonehaven and District*

Marr
Ballater and Crathie*
Ballogie and Birse*
Banchory*
Braemar*
Cluny, Midmar and Monymusk
Crathes, Drumoak and Durris*
Cromar*
Donside
Feughdee West*
Finzean*
Huntly*
Lumphanan*
Mid-Deeside*
Strathbogie*
Tap o' Noth*
Torphins*

Angus
As of July 2012, there are 25 community council areas in the council area. Those marked with asterisks have active community councils.
Aberlemno
Auchterhouse
Carnoustie
City of Brechin & District
Ferryden & Craig
Friockheim
Glamis
Hillside, Dun & Logie Pert
Inverarity
Inveresk
Kirriemuir
Kirriemuir Landward East
Kirriemuir Landward West
Letham & District
Lunanhead & District
Monifieth
Monikie & Newbigging
Montrose
Muirhead, Birkhill and Liff
Murroes & Wellbank
Newtyle & Eassie
Royal Burgh of Arbroath
Royal Burgh of Forfar
Strathmartine
Tealing

Argyll and Bute
As of July 2012, there are 56 community council areas in the council area. Those marked with an asterisk have active community councils. The communities are listed by the areas under the council's decentralisation scheme.

Bute and Cowal
Ardentinny*
Bute*
Cairndow*
Colintraive and Glendaruel*
Dunoon*
Hunter's Quay*
Kilfinan*
Kilmun*
Lochgoil*
Sandbank*
South Cowal*
Strachur*

Helensburgh and Lomond
Arrochar and Tarbet*
Cardross*
Cove and Kilcreggan*
Garelochhead*
Helensburgh*
Luss and Arden*
Rhu and Shandon*
Rosneath and Clynder*

Mid Argyll, Kintyre and Islay
Ardrishaig*
Campbeltown*
Colonsay*
Craignish*
Dunadd*
East Kintyre*
Furnace*
Gigha*
Inveraray*
Islay*
Jura*
Lochgilphead*
North Knapdale
South Knapdale*
Southend*
Tarbert and Skipness*
The Laggan*
West Kintyre*
West Lochfyne*

Oban, Lorn and the Isles
Appin*
Ardchattan*
Avich and Kilchrenan*
Coll*
Connel*
Dunbeg*
Glenorchy and Innishail*
Iona*
Kilmore*
Kilninver and Kilmelford*
Lismore*
Luing*
Mull*
Oban*
Seil & Easdale*
Taynuilt*
Tiree

Clackmannanshire
As of July 2012, there are 9 community council areas in the council area. Those marked with asterisks have active community councils.
Alloa*
Alva*
Clackmannan*
Dollar*
Menstrie*
Muckhart*
Sauchie & Fishcross*
Tillicoultry, Coalsnaughton & Devonside*
Tullibody, Cambus and Glenochil*

Dumfries and Galloway
As of July 2012, there are 107 community council areas in the council area. Those marked with asterisks have active community councils.

Annandale and Eskdale
Brydekirk and District*
Canonbie and District*
Cummertrees and Cummertrees West*
Dalton and Carrutherstown*
Eastriggs Dornock & Creca*
Eskdalemuir*
Gretna, Scotland and Rigg*
Hoddom and Ecclefechan*
Johnstone*
Kirkpatrick Fleming and District*
Kirkpatrick Juxta*
Kirtle and Eaglesfield*
Langholm, Ewes and Westerkirk*
Lockerbie & District*
Middlebie and Waterbeck*
Moffat and District*
North Milk
Balamory
Royal Burgh of Annan*
Royal Burgh of Lochmaben and District*
Springfield and Gretna Green*
Templand and District*
The Royal Four Towns*
Wamphray*

Nithsdale

Dumfries and Lower Nithsdale
Ae*
Beeswing*
Caerlaverock*
Corberry and Laurieknowe
Georgetown*
Heathhall*
Kingholm Quay
Kirkbean*
Kirkmahoe*
Kirkmichael
Lincluden
Locharbriggs
Lochside and Woodlands*
Loreburn*
Mouswald°
New Abbey*
Ruthwell and Clarencefield*
Ryedale
Southerness*
St Michaels
Summerville and Stakeford
Terregles*
Tinwald Parish*
Torthorwald*
Troqueer Landward*

Upper Nithsdale
Auldgirth and District*
Carronbridge*
Closeburn*
Dunscore*
Durisdeer
Glencairn*
Holywood and Newbridge*
Irongray*
Keir*
Kirkconnel and Kelloholm*
Penpont*
Royal Burgh of Sanquhar and District*
Thornhill*
Tynron*
Wanlockhead

Stewartry
Auchencairn*
Balmaclellan*
Balmaghie*
Borgue*
Buittle Parish*
Carsphairn*
Castle Douglas*
Colvend and Southwick *
Corsock and Kirkpatrick Durham*
Crossmichael and District*
Dalbeattie*
Dalry*
Dundrennan*
Gatehouse of Fleet*
Kelton*
Kirkgunzeon*
Lochrutton*
Parton*
Royal Burgh of Kirkcudbright and District*
Royal Burgh of New Galloway and Kells Parish*
Tongland*
Twynholm*
Urr or Haugh of Urr*

Wigtown
Cairnryan*
Castle Kennedy
Cree Valley*
Garlieston*
Isle of Whithorn*
Kirkcolm *
Kirkcowan*
Kirkmabreck*
Kirkmaiden*
Leswalt
Lochans
New Luce *
Ochtrelure and Belmont*
Old Luce*
Port William and District*
Portpatrick*
Royal Burgh of Whithorn & District*
Royal Burgh of Wigtown and District *
Sorbie
Stoneykirk*
Stranraer

Dundee City
As of July 2012, there are 19 community council areas in the council area. Those marked with asterisks have active community councils. 
Ancrum/Blackness
Ardler
Broughty Ferry*
Camperdown
Charleston/Denhead of Gray
City Centre and Harbour*
Coldside
Craigiebank and Craigiebarns
Claverhouse/Mill O Mains
Douglas, Angus and Craigie
Downfield and Brackens
Fintry*
Kirkton
Lochee
Menzieshill
Mid Craigie/Linlathen
Stobswell and District
West End*
Whitfield

There are also 3 Neighbourhood Representative Structures established as alternatives to community councils:
Ardler Village Trust
Kirkton Partnership
Stobswell Forum

East Ayrshire
As of July 2012, there are 35 community council areas in the council area. Those marked with asterisks have active community councils.
Auchinleck*
Bellfield*
Bonnyton*
Catrine*
Crosshouse*
Cumnock  *
Dalmellington*
Dalrymple*
Darvel and District*
Drongan, Rankinston & Stair*
Dunlop & Lugton*
Fenwick*
Galston*
Gatehead
Grange/Howard Kilmarnock*
Hurlford and Crookedholm*
Kilmaurs*
Knockentiber
Lugar and Logan*
Mauchline*
Moscow and Waterside*
Muirkirk*
Netherthird & District*
New Cumnock*
New Farm Loch*
Newmilns and Greenholm*
Northwest Kilmarnock
Ochiltree*
Patna*
Piersland-Bentinck*
Riccarton Kilmarnock 
Shortlees Kilmarnock  
Sorn*
Southcraigs-Dean *
Stewarton and District*

East Dunbartonshire
As of July 2012, there are 13 community council areas in the council area. Those marked with asterisks have active community councils.
Baldernock*
Bearsden East*
Bearsden North*
Bearsden West*
Bishopbriggs*
Campsie*
Kirkintilloch*
Lenzie*
Milngavie*
Milton of Campsie*
Torrance*
Twechar
Waterside*

East Lothian
As of July 2012, there are 20 community council areas in the council area. Those marked with asterisks have active community councils.
Cockenzie and Port Seton*
Dunbar*
Dunpender*
East Lammermuir (Oldhamstocks, Innerwick, Spott and Stenton)*
Garvald and Morham*
Gifford*
Gullane Area*
Haddington and District*
Humbie, East and West Saltoun and Bolton*
Longniddry*
Macmerry and Gladsmuir*
Musselburgh and Inveresk*
North Berwick*
Ormiston*
Pencaitland*
Prestonpans*
Tranent and Elphinstone*
Wallyford*
West Barns*
Whitecraig

East Renfrewshire
As of January 2023, there are 11 community council areas in the council area. Those marked with asterisks have active community councils:

Barrhead*
Broom, Kirkhill and Mearnskirk*
Busby*
Clarkston*
Crookfur, Greenfarm and Mearns Village*
Eaglesham and Waterfoot*
Giffnock*
Neilston*
Netherlee and Stamperland*
Thornliebank*
Uplawmoor*

City of Edinburgh
As of July 2012, there are 46 community council areas in the council area. Those marked with asterisks have active community councils.
Balerno*
Colinton
Corstorphine*
Craigentinny/Meadowbank*
Craigleith/Blackhall*
Craiglockhart*
Craigmillar*
Cramond and Barnton*
Currie*
Drum Brae*
Drylaw/Telford*
Fairmilehead*
Firrhill*
Gilmerton/Inch
Gorgie/Dalry*
Grange/Prestonfield*
Granton & District*
Hutchison/Chesser*
Juniper Green*
Kirkliston*
Leith Central*
Leith Harbour and Newhaven*
Leith Links*
Liberton and District*
Longstone*
Marchmont and Sciennes*
Merchiston*
Morningside*
Muirhouse/Salvesen*
Murrayfield*
New Town /Broughton*
Northfield/Willowbrae*
Old Town*
Portobello*
Queensferry and District*
Ratho and District*
Sighthill/Broomhouse/Parkhead*
Silverknowes
Southside
Stenhouse, Saughton Mains & Whitson*
Stockbridge/Inverleith*
Tollcross*
Trinity*
West End*
West Pilton/West Granton*
Wester Hailes*

Na h-Eileanan Siar
As of July 2012, there are 30 community council areas in the council area. Those marked with asterisks have active community councils. The communities are listed by decentralisation areas.

Lewis
Airidhantuim
Back*
Barvas
Bernera*
Breasclete*
Carloway*
Kinloch*
Laxdale
Ness*
North Lochs*
North Tolsta*
Pairc*
Point*
Sandwick*
Shawbost*
Stornoway
Tong*
Uig*

Harris
North*
South*
Scalpay*

Uist
Berneray*
Benbecula*
Bornish*
Eriskay*
Iochdar*
Lochboisdale*
North *

Barra
Castlebay & Vatersay*
Northbay*

Falkirk
As of July 2012, there are 18 community council areas in the council area. Those marked with asterisks have active community councils.
Airth Parish*
Avonbridge and Standburn*
Bainsford, Langlees & New Carron*
Banknock, Haggs, Longcroft*
Blackness*
Bo'ness*
Bonnybridge*
Brightons*
Denny & District*
Falkirk South*
Grahamston, Middlefield & Westfield*
Grangemouth & Skinflats*
Larbert, Stenhousemuir & Torwood*
Lower Braes*
Maddiston*
Polmont*
Reddingmuirhead & Wallacestone*
Shieldhill & California*

Fife
As of July 2012, there are 105 community council areas in the council area. Those marked with asterisks have active community councils.
Abbeyview*
Abdie & Dunbog*
Aberdour*
Auchmuty/Woodside (Glenrothes)
Auchtermuchty & Strathmiglo*
Auchtertool*
Balmerino, Kilmany & Logie
Balmullo*
Bellyeoman*
Benarty*
Bennochy/Hayfield
Blairhall*
Boarhills & Dunino*
Buckhaven
Burntisland*
Cairneyhill*
Cameron*
Cardenden*
Carnbee & Arncroach*
Carnock & Gowkhall*
Central Dunfermline*
Ceres & District*
Charlestown, Limekilns and Pattiesmuir*
Coaltown of Wemyss*
Colinsburgh & Kilconquhar*
Collessie
Cowdenbeath*
Crail & District*
Creich & Flisk*
Crombie*
Crossford*
Crossgates and Mossgreen*
Culross*
Cults*
Dairsie*
Dalgety Bay & Hillend*
Dysart
East Wemyss and McDuff*
Elie & The Royal Burgh of Earlsferry*
Falkland & Newton of Falkland*
Freuchie*
Giffordtown & District*
Glenwood (Glenrothes)
Guardbridge*
Halbeath
Headwell
High Valleyfield*
Hill of Beath
Inverkeithing*
Izatt Avenue & Nethertown Area
Kelty*
Kemback, Pitscottie and Blebo*
Kennoway*
Kettle*
Kincardine*
Kinghorn*
Kinglassie*
Kingsbarns*
Kingseat*
Kirkcaldy East
Kirkcaldy North*
Kirkcaldy West*
Ladybank & District*
Largo Area*
Largoward & District
Leslie*
Leuchars*
Leven
Lochgelly*
Low Valleyfield*
Lumphinnans*
Markinch*
Methil
Methilhill
Milesmark & Baldridge*
Milton & Coaltown of Balgonie*
Monimail*
Moonzie
Newburgh*
Newport, Wormit & Forgan*
North Glenrothes*
North Queensferry*
Oakley and Comrie*
Pitcorthie*
Pitteuchar, Stenton and Finglassie*
Rosyth*
Royal Burgh of Cupar & District*
Royal Burgh of Pittenweem & District*
Royal Burgh of St Andrews*
Royal Burghs of Kilrenny & Anstruther & of Cellardyke*
Saline & Steelend*
South Parks & Rimbleton (Glenrothes)
Springfield*
St Monans*
Star of Markinch
Strathkinness*
Tayport Ferryport-on-Craig*
Templehall
Thornton*
Torryburn & Newmills*
Touch & Garvock*
Townhill*
Wellwood
West Wemyss
Windygates

Glasgow City
As of July 2012, there are 101 community council areas in the council area. Those marked with asterisks have active community councils.
Anderston*
Arden, Carnwadric, Kennishead & Old Darnley*
Auchenshuggle*
Baillieston*
Balgrayhill
Barlanark
Blairdardie & Old Drumchapel*
Blythswood & Broomielaw
Bridgeton & Dalmarnock *
Broomhill *
Broomhouse *
Cadder*
Calton *
Camlachie
Carmunnock*
Carmyle*
Castlemilk
Cathcart & District*
Claythorn*
Craigton*
Cranhill
Croftfoot & Menock*
Crosshill & Govanhill*
Darnley & Southpark Village*
Dennistoun*
Dowanhill, Hyndland & Kelvinside*
Drumchapel*
Drumoyne*
Dumbreck*
Dundasvale
Easterhouse Central
Easterhouse North
Fullarton
Garnethill*
Garrowhill*
Gartcraig*
Garthamlock & Craigend*
Gartloch*
Germiston*
Govan*
Govan East*
Hillhead*
Hillington, North Cardonald & Penilee*
Hurlet & Brockburn
Hutchesontown*
Ibrox Cessnock*
Jordanhill*
Kelvindale*
Kings Park and Croftfoot*
Kinning Park*
Knightswood*
Knightswood North & Templar*
Lambhill & District*
Langside, Battlefield & Camphill*
Laurieston*
Levern & District*
Mansewood & Hillpark
Maryhill & Summerston*
Merchant City*
Milton*
Molendinar*
Mosspark*
Mount Florida*
Mount Vernon*
Newlands & Auldhouse*
North Kelvin*
Oatlands*
Parkhead*
Parkhouse*
Partick*
Petershill
Pollok*
Pollok North*
Pollokshaws & Eastwood*
Pollokshields*
Possilpark*
Robroyston*
Royston
Ruchazie
Ruchill*
Sandyhills*
Scotstoun*
Shawlands & Strathbungo*
Shettleston
Sighthill*
Simshill & Old Cathcart*
South Cardonald & Crookston*
Springboig
Springburn Central
Swinton*
Thornwood*
Toryglen*
Townhead & Ladywell*
Wallacewell*
Wellhouse & Queenslie*
Whiteinch*
Woodlands & Park*
Woodside*
Wyndford & District*
Yoker*
Yorkhill & Kelvingrove*

Highland
, there are 157 community council areas in the council area, three of which are not currently established. Those marked with asterisks have active community councils.

Caithness, Sutherland and Easter Ross
Alness*
Ardgay and District*
Ardross*
Assynt*
Balintore and Hilton*
Berriedale and Dunbeath*
Bettyhill, Strathnaver and Altnaharra*
Bower*
Brora*
Caithness West*
Castletown*
Creich*
Dornoch*
Dunnet and Canisbay*
Durness*
Edderton*
Fearn*
Golspie*
Halkirk*
Helmsdale*
Inver*
Invergordon*
Kilmuir Easter and Logie Easter*
Kinlochbervie*
Lairg*
Latheron, Lybster and Clyth*
Melvich*
Nigg and Shandwick*
Rogart*
Saltburn and Westwood*
Scourie*
Sinclairs Bay*
Strathy and Armadale*
Tain*
Tannach and District*
Tarbat*
Thurso*
Tongue*
Watten*
Wick*

Inverness, Nairn, Badenoch and Strathspey
Ardersier and Petty*
Auldearn*
Aviemore*
Ballifeary*
Balloch*
Beauly*
Boat of Garten*
Carrbridge*
Cawdor And West Nairnshire*
Central	
Cromdale and Advie*
Crown*
Croy*
Culcabock and Drakies*
Dalneigh and Columba*
Dalwhinnie*
Dores and Essich*
Dulnain Bridge*
East Nairnshire*
Fort Augustus and Glenmoriston*
Glenurquhart*
Grantown On Spey*
Hilton, Milton and Castle Heather*
Holm*
Inverness South*
Inverness West*
Kilmorack*
Kiltarlity*
Kincraig*
Kingussie*
Kirkhill and Bunchrew*
Laggan	
Lochardil*
Merkinch*
Muirtown*
Nairn - Suburban*
Nairn - West*
Nairn River*
Nethy Bridge*
Newtonmore*
Park*
Raigmore*
Smithton and Culloden*
Strathdearn*
Stratherrick and Foyers*
Strathglass*
Strathnairn*
Westhill*

Ross, Skye and Lochaber
Acharacle*
Applecross*
Ardgour*
Arisaig*
Aultbea*
Avoch and Killen*
Ballachulish*
Braes (not on list with map on page *8 of scheme)*
Broadford and Strath*
Caol	
Coigach*
Conon Bridge*
Contin*
Cromarty*
Dingwall*
Dornie And District*
Dunvegan*
Duror and Kentallen*
Ferintosh*
Fort William*
Fortrose and Rosemarkie*
Gairloch*
Garve and District*
Glencoe and Glen Etive*
Glendale*
Glenelg and Arnisdale*
Glenfinnan*
Glengarry*
Inverlochy and Torlundy*
Killearnan*
Kilmallie*
Kilmuir*
Kiltearn*
Kinlochleven*
Knockbain*
Kyle*
Kyleakin and Kylerhea*
Lochalsh*
Lochbroom*
Lochcarron*
Lochduich*
Mallaig*
Marybank, Scatwell and Strathconon*
Maryburgh*
Minginish*
Morar*
Morvern*
Muir of Ord*
Nether Lochaber*
Plockton*
Portree*
Raasay*
Resolis*
Sconser*
Shieldaig*
Skeabost*
Sleat*
Small Isles*
Spean Bridge, Roy Bridge and Achnacarry*
Staffin*
Strathpeffer*
Stromeferry*
Struan*
Sunart*
Torridon and Kinlochewe*
Uig*
Waternish*
Wester Loch Ewe*
Western Ardnamurchan*

Inverclyde
As of February 2023, there are 11 community council areas in the council area. Those marked with asterisks have active community councils.
Gourock*
Greenock Central
Greenock East
Greenock Southwest*
Greenock West and Cardwell Bay*
Holefarm and Cowdenknowes
Inverkip and Wemyss Bay*
Kilmacolm*
Larkfield, Braeside and Branchton*
Port Glasgow East
Port Glasgow West*

Midlothian
As of July 2012, there are 16 community council areas in the council area. Those marked with asterisks have active community councils.
Bonnyrigg and Lasswade*
Dalkeith and district*
Damhead and district*
Danderhall and district*
Eskbank and Newbattle*
Gorebridge*
Howgate*
Loanhead and district*
Mayfield and Easthouses*
Moorfoot*
Newtongrange*
Penicuik and district*
Poltonhall and district*
Rosewell and district*
Roslin and Bilston*
Tynewater*

Moray
, there are 20 community council areas in the council area, four of which are not currently established. Those marked with asterisks have active community councils.
Buckie*
Burghead & Cummingston*
Cullen & Deskford*
Dyke Landward*
Elgin*
Finderne	
Findhorn & Kinloss*
Findochty & District*
Forres*
Glenlivet	
Heldon*
Hopeman & Covesea	
Innes*
Keith*
Lennox*
Lossiemouth*
Portknockie*
Rathven & Arradoul*
Speyside	
Strathisla*

North Ayrshire
As of July 2012, there are 17 community council areas in the council area. Those marked with asterisks have active community councils.
Ardrossan
Arran*
Beith & District*
Cumbrae*
Dalry*
Dreghorn
Fairlie*
Girdle Toll & Bourtreehill
Irvine*
Kilbirnie & Glengarnock*
Kilwinning*
Largs*
Saltcoats*
Skelmorlie*
Springside
Stevenston
West Kilbride*

North Lanarkshire
As of July 2012, there are 81 community council areas in the council area. Those marked with asterisks have active community councils.
Abronhill and Arns
Allanton and Hartwood
Auchinloch*
Balloch and Eastfield
Banton and Kelvinhead*
Bargeddie
Bellshill*
Blackwood and Craiglinn
Blairhill
Cairnhill*
Calder
Calder Valley
Calderbank
Caldercruix
Cambusnethan
Carbrain and Hillcrest*
Carfin*
Carrickstone
Castlecary*
Central Coatbridge*
Central Wishaw*
Chapelhall
Chapelside
Chryston*
Clarkston
Cleland
Cliftonville*
Coatdyke
Coltness*
Condorrat*
Craigmarloch*
Craigneuk*
Croy
Dullatur*
Forgewood
Gartcosh*
Gartlea
Gartness
Glenboig
Glencairn
Glenmavis*
Golfhill, Burnfoot and Commonside
Greenfaulds and Luggiebank
Greengairs*
Harthill and Eastfield*
Holehills, Rawyards and Thrashbush
Holytown
Kildrum*
Kilsyth*
Kirkshaws
Kirkwood
Ladywell*
Langloan
Longriggend
Monkland Glen*
Moodiesburn
Mossend
Muirhouse and Flemington*
Netherton and Gowkthrapple
New Stevenston
Newarthill
Newmains and District*
North Calder*
North Motherwell
Old Monkland
Overtown and Waterloo*
Plains*
Queenzieburn*
Salsburgh*
Seafar and Ravenswood*
Shawhead
Shotts*
Stepps and District*
Sunnyside
Thorniewood*
The Village*
Townhead
Westerwood*
Westfield*
Whifflet
Whinhall

Orkney
As of July 2012, there are 20 community council areas in the council area. Those marked with asterisks have active community councils.
Birsay*
Eday*
Evie and Rendall*
Firth and Stenness*
Flotta*
Graemsay, Hoy and Walls*
Harray and Sandwick*
Holm*
Kirkwall & St Ola*
North Ronaldsay*
Orphir*
Papa Westray*
Rousay, Egilsay, Wyre & Gairsay*
Sanday *
Shapinsay*
South Ronaldsay and Burray*
St Andrews and Deerness*
Stromness*
Stronsay*
Westray*

Perth and Kinross
As of July 2012, there are 52 community council areas in the council area. Those marked with asterisks have active community councils.
Aberfeldy*
Abernethy and District*
Alyth*
Auchterarder and District*
Auchtergaven*
Blackford*
Blair Atholl and Struan*
Blairgowrie and Rattray*
Braco and Greenloaning*
Bridgend, Gannochy and Kinnoull*
Burrelton and District*
Central
City South
Cleish and Blairadam*
Comrie and District*
Coupar Angus and Bendochy*
Crieff*
Dull and Weem*
Dunkeld and Birnam*
Dunning*
Earn*
East Strathearn*
Errol*
Fossoway*
Glenfarg*
Glenlyon and Loch Tay*
Inchture*
Invergowrie and Kingoodie
Kenmore and District*
Kettins*
Killiecrankie and Fincastle*
Kinross*
Letham
Longforgan*
Luncarty, Redgorton and Moneydie*
Meigle and Ardler*
Methven*
Mid Atholl, Strathtay and Grandtully*
Milnathort*
Mount Blair*
Muthill and Tullibardine*
North Inch and Muirton*
North Muirton*
Pitlochry and Moulin*
Portmoak*
Rannoch and Tummel*
Scone and District*
Spittalfield and District*
St Fillans*
Stanley*
Tulloch
West Carse*

Renfrewshire
At February 2023, there are 25 community council areas in the council area. Those marked with asterisks have active community councils.
Bishopton*
Bridge of Weir*
Brookfield*
Charleston
Elderslie*
Erskine*
Ferguslie*
Foxbar and Brediland
Gallowhill
Glenburn
Hawkhead and Lochfield*
Houston*
Howwood*
Hunterhill
Inchinnan*
Johnstone*
Kilbarchan*
Langbank*
Linwood*
Lochwinnoch*
Paisley East and Whitehaugh*
Paisley North*
Paisley West and Central*
Ralston*
Renfrew*

Scottish Borders
As of July 2012, there are 67 community council areas in the council area. Those marked with asterisks have active community councils.
Abbey St Bathans, Bonkyl and Preston*
Ancrum*
Ayton*
Bowden*
Burnfoot*
Burnmouth*
Carlops*
Chirnside*
Clovenfords and District*
Cockburnspath*
Coldingham*
Coldstream and District*
Crailing, Eckford and Nisbet*
Cranshaws, Ellemford and Longformacus*
Denholm and District*
Duns*
Earlston*
Eddleston and District*
Ednam, Stichill and Berrymoss*
Edrom, Allanton and Whitsome
Ettrick and Yarrow*
Eyemouth*
Floors, Makerstoun, Nenthorn and Smailholm*
Foulden, Mordington, & Lamberton*
Galashiels and Langlee*
Gavinton, Fogo and Polwarth*
Gordon and Westruther*
Grantshouse*
Greenlaw and Hume
Hawick*
Heiton and Roxburgh*
Heriot*
Hobkirk*
Hutton and Paxton*
Innerleithen and District*
Jed Valley*
Jedburgh*
Kalewater*
Kelso*
Lamancha, Newlands and Kirkurd*
Lanton*
Lauderdale*
Leitholm, Eccles and Birgham*
Lilliesleaf, Ashkirk and Midlem*
Manor, Stobo and Lyne*
Maxton and Mertoun*
Melrose and District*
Newcastleton and District*
Newtown and Eildon*
Oxnam Water*
Oxton and Channelkirk*
Reston and Auchencrow*
Royal Burgh of Peebles and District*
Royal Burgh of Selkirk and District*
Skirling*
Southdean*
Sprouston*
St Abbs*
St Boswells Parish*
Stow and Fountainhall*
Swinton and Ladykirk*
Tweedbank*
Upper Teviotdale and Borthwick Water*
Upper Tweed*
Walkerburn and District*
West Linton*
Yetholm*

Shetland
As of July 2012, there are 18 community council areas in the council area. Those marked with asterisks have active community councils.
Bressay*
Burra and Trondra*
Delting*
Dunrossness*
Fetlar*
Gulberwick, Quarff and Cunningsburgh*
Lerwick*
Nesting and Lunnasting*
Northmaven*
Sandness and Walls*
Sandsting and Aithsting*
Sandwick*
Scalloway*
Skerries*
Tingwall, Whiteness and Weisdale*
Unst*
Whalsay*
Yell*

South Ayrshire
As of July 2012, there are 29 community council areas in the council area. Those marked with asterisks have active community councils.
Alloway and Doonfoot*
Annbank and Coylton*
Ballantrae*
Barr*
Barrhill*
Belmont and Kincaidston*
Colmonell and Lendalfoot*
Craigie*
Crosshill, Straiton and Kirkmichael*
Dailly*
Dundonald*
Dunure*
Forehill, Holmston and Masonhill*
Fort, Seafield and Wallacetown*
Girvan and District*
Kirkoswald, Maidens and Turnberry*
Loans*
Maybole*
Minishant*
Monkton
Mossblown and St Quivox*
Newton and Heathfield*
North Ayr*
Pinwherry and Pinmore*
Prestwick North*
Prestwick South*
Symington*
Tarbolton*
Troon*

South Lanarkshire
As of July 2012, there are 58 community council areas in the council area. Those marked with asterisks have active community councils.

Cambuslang/Rutherglen
Burnside*
Cambuslang*
Halfway*
Rutherglen*

Clydesdale
Biggar*
Blackmount*
Blackwood and Kirkmuirhill
Carluke*
Carmichael
Carnwath*
Carstairs
Clyde Valley
Coalburn*
Crawford*
Douglas
Douglas Water and Rigside
Duneaton*
Forth
Leadhills*
Lesmahagow*
Quothquan and Thankerton*
New Lanark*
Pettinain*
Symington*
Tarbrax*
The Royal Burgh of Lanark*

East Kilbride
Calderwood*
East Mains*
Greenhills
Hairmyres
Jackton and Thorntonhall*
Lindsay, Auldhouse and Chapelton*
Murray*
Sandford and Upper Avondale*
St. Leonards*
Stewartfield
Strathaven*
West Mains
Westwood*
Whitehills

Hamilton
Ashgill/Netherburn*
Blantyre
Bothwell*
Burnbank
Earnock
Hamilton Centre
Hamilton Centre and Ferniegair
Hillhouse*
Larkhall*
Low Waters
Meikle Earnock
Quarter and Cadzow
Silvertonhill
Stonehouse*
Uddingston*
Udston
Wellhall
Whitehill

Stirling
As of July 2012, there are 43 community council areas in the council area. Those marked with asterisks have active community councils.
Arnprior*
Balfron*
Balquhidder, Lochearnhead & Strathyre*
Bannockburn*
Borestone*
Braehead & District*
Bridge of Allan*
Broomridge*
Buchanan*
Buchlyvie*
Callander*
Cambusbarron*
Cambuskenneth*
Carron Valley*
Causewayhead*
Cornton*
Cowie*
Croftamie*
Drymen*
Dunblane*
Fintry*
Gargunnock*
Gartmore*
Hillpark & Milton*
Killearn*
Killin*
Kilmadock*
Kings Park*
Kippen*
Logie*
Mercat Cross*
Plean*
Polmaise*
Port of Menteith*
Raploch*
Riverside*
Strathard*
Strathblane*
Strathfillan*
Thornhill & Blairdrummond*
Throsk*
Torbrex*
Trossachs*

West Dunbartonshire
As of July 2012, there are 17 community council areas in the council area. Those marked with asterisks have active community councils.
Alexandria
Balloch and Haldane*
Bonhill and Dalmonach*
Bowling and Milton*
Clydebank East*
Dalmuir and Mountblow*
Dumbarton East and Central*
Dumbarton North
Dumbarton West
Duntocher and Hardgate*
Faifley*
Kilmaronock*
Linnvale and Drumry*
Old Kilpatrick*
Parkhall, North Kilbowie and Central*
Renton
Silverton and Overtoun*

West Lothian
As of July 2012, there are 40 community council areas in the council area. Those marked with asterisks have active community councils.
Addiewell/Loganlea*
Armadale*
Bathgate*
Bellsquarry*
Blackburn*
Blackridge*
Breich*
Bridgend*
Broxburn*
Carmondean	
Craigshill*
Deans	
Dechmont*
Dedridge*
East Calder & Wilkieston*
Ecclesmachan & Threemiletown*
Eliburn	
Fauldhouse*
Howden	
Kirknewton*
Knightsridge*
Ladywell*
Linlithgow & Linlithgow Bridge*
Livingston Village*
Longridge*
Mid Calder*
Murieston*
Newton*
Philpstoun*
Polbeth*
Pumpherston*
Seafield*
Stoneyburn*
Torphichen*
Uphall*
Uphall Station*
West Calder & Harburn*
Westfield & Bridgehouse*
Whitburn & Greenrigg*
Winchburgh*

See also
 List of civil parishes in Scotland
 Local government in Scotland

References

External links
 Community Councils in Scotland

Local government in Scotland
Scotland geography-related lists
Administrative divisions of Scotland